Motel is a 2005 album by New York City brutal prog band Pak. It has been well received in the indie marketplace it was targeted for.

Track listing
1 "You Like It Like That" (5:10)
2 "Heatwave" (3:21)
3 "100% Human Hair" (1:39)
4 "Jam Jel Treatment" (3:36)
5 "The Higher The Elevation The Lesser The Vegetation" (4:49)
6 "Every Body Likes You" (9:52)
7 "Zugzwang" (4:00)
8 "Bienvenue A L´Hotel Plastique" (9:51)

Performers
 Ron Anderson (guitar, piano, vocals)
 Jesse Krakow (Fast 'n' Bulbous) on bass
 Keith Abrams drummer
Carla Kihlstedt-violin (Sleepytime Gorilla Museum)
Ross Bonadonna-sax, Tim Byrnes-trumpet
Stephen Gauci-sax.

References

2005 albums